Honduras competed at the 1992 Summer Olympics in Barcelona, Spain. Ten competitors, seven men and three women, took part in 25 events in 4 sports.

Competitors
The following is the list of number of competitors in the Games.

Athletics

Men's 100 metres
Jaime Zelaya 
 Heat — 11.02 (→ did not advance)

Men's 5,000 metres
Polin Belisle
 Heat — did not start (→ did not advance)

Men's Triple Jump
Luis Flores 
 Qualification — 15.08 m (→ did not advance)

Men's Decathlon
Jorge Maradiaga 
100 metres — 11.75 
Long jump — 6.18   
Shot put — 9.54   
High jump — 1.70   
400 metres — 54.81   
110m hurdles — 16.20
Discus throw — 30.26   
Pole vault — 4.00   
Javelin throw — 42.46   
1,500 metres — 5:04.10 
Final Standings — 5.746 (→ 28 place)

Fencing

One female fencer represented Honduras in 1992.

Women's foil
 Elvia Reyes

Swimming

Plutarco Castellanos
Salvador Jiménez
Ana Fortin
Claudia Fortin

Weightlifting

Osman Manzanares

See also
Honduras at the 1991 Pan American Games
Honduras at the 1993 Central American and Caribbean Games

References

External links
Official Olympic Reports

Nations at the 1992 Summer Olympics
Olympics
1992